IFHT Films is a Canadian film production company, founded in 2009 by Matt Dennison and Jason Lucas. The company specialises in comedy and action sport videos, and distributes them on their YouTube channel with over 755,000 subscribers.

History 
IFHT Films was founded by Richmond based Matt Dennison and Jason Lucas. The two met through mountain biking at a young age, and started filming themselves riding dirt jumps in Matt's backyard. In 2009, once winter rolled around, Matt and Jason filmed comedy skits indoors and uploaded them to their YouTube channel that they named "I F*cking Hate That." The duo gained local popularity over the next few years, then experienced their first viral video "If Diablo 3 Were A Girl" in 2012. Matt and Jason later became known for their "How To Be" series and comedy music videos. IFHT videos were primarily made for fun in their early years, however they started pairing up with companies such as CBC Comedy and Trek Bicycles to help them pursue filmmaking full-time. The team tackled a wide array of topics, but biking was one theme that continued to come up. To date, their most viewed video is "How To Buy a Mountain Bike", garnering over 14 million views.

Mahalo My Dude 
Mahalo My Dude is a mountain biking YouTube channel and merchandise store founded by IFHT Films co-founder, Matt Dennison. In 2016, what started as the IFHT Film's vlog channel "ifht2" quickly transitioned into one of the first mountain biking channels on YouTube, called "Matt Dennison." Matt made biking videos solo until Jason Lucas joined him in 2017, commencing a YouTube channel name change to "Matt and Jason." The duo put a lot of miles under their bike tires, as they documented their travels to places like Vancouver Island, Quebec, and France. Matt and Jason also drew from their comedy roots as they blended biking with humour in videos such as "$59 Walmart Bike vs $6500 Mountain Bike" and "IT'S CRANK WORX BABY." The channel continued to grow, and in 2019 it was renamed to "Mahalo My Dude" to accommodate expansion of the team.

Mahalo My Dude is also known for its merchandise store that sells stickers, t-shirts, biking accessories and custom mountain bike jerseys.

Matt Dennison 
Matt Dennison is a Canadian film director and YouTuber. He is the co-founder of film production company IFHT Films. He is also the founder of mountain biking YouTube channel, Mahalo My Dude. As a film director, Matt is known for directing several projects involving Trek Bicycles, most notably "How To Buy a Mountain Bike" and "Once Daily Bikes by Trek." Matt is also known for directing several music videos for Canadian R&B duo Manila Grey.

Jason Lucas 
Jason Lucas is a Canadian filmmaker, mountain biker and co-founder of film production company IFHT Films. From writing, to producing, to acting, Jason has worn many hats at throughout the years. Jason starred in and wrote the viral video "How to Buy a Mountain Bike." Most recently, Jason starred as the host of Pink bike Academy.

References

External links
 Official Website

Canadian comedy troupes
2009 establishments in Canada